Algorist may refer to:
A person skilled in the technique of performing basic decimal arithmetic, known as algorism
A person skilled in the design of algorithms
An algorithmic artist